Marco Misciagna (born 5 February 1984) is an Italian violinist and violist.

Biography 
Marco Misciagna was born in Bari, Italy.

He graduated at the age of 15 in violin and viola at the N. Piccinni Conservatory of Bari and he later obtained the Diploma at the National Academy of Santa Cecilia in Rome. 

He was a guest of the Berliner Philharmonie. For years he was Principal Viola Soloist of the Spanish String Orchestra of Màlaga. 

He has collaborated with Uto Ughi, Alexander Rudin, Sergey Stadler.

He is Honorary Professor of the .Rachmaninov State Conservatory in Tambov. 

He is Lieutenant Commissioner of the Volunteer Military Corps of the Italian Red Cross, auxiliary of the Armed Forces, with Decree of the President of the Republic.

Discography 
He made a CD produced by the Dynamic record company and sponsored by the Lions Club, the proceeds of which were donated to charity to construct of a multifunctional center dedicated to children. In addition, he has recorded for the record company DAD-Records, in world premiere recording, the Quintet op.128 and the Rhapsody op.88 by R.Gervasio.

 Christmas In Classic - Vito Vilardi, Marco Misciagna - Label: Terramiamusic - 2010
 Carulli, Giuliani, Paganini - Marco Misciagna, Vito Vilardi - Label: Digressione Music - DCTT113 - 2018
 The Curve Of A Day - Marco Misciagna
 Sette, Vittorio Pasquale - Marco Misciagna - Label: Digressione Music
 Beautiful Melodies for Viola and Piano - Marco Misciagna  - Label: IMD - IMD100 - 2021
 Chamber and Piano Solo Works, Vol. 3 - Marco Misciagna
 The Greatest Movie Soundtrack for Viola and Piano - Marco Misciagna - Label: IMD - IMD200 - 2022
 Maurice Vieux Complete Music for Unaccompanied Viola (World Premiere Recording) - Marco Misciagna - Label: Digressione Music - DCTT129 - 2022
 Campagnoli: 41 Caprices for Viola, Op. 22, arranged for Viola and Piano by Carl Albert Tottmann - Marco Misciagna - Label: Brilliant Classics - 96551 - 2022

Original compositions and arrangements 
Original compositions:
 Two Flamenco Caprices for unaccompanied viola - El Vito / Malagueña (also a version for unaccompanied violin).
 Introduction and Variations on the Theme “Mer Hayrenik” (Armenian National Anthem) for unaccompanied viola.
 Morricone Film Suite for solo viola (Suite in 8 movements, homage to Ennio Morricone)
 Viola Blues for unaccompanied viola
 6 Jazz Viola Preludes for unaccompanied viola (1-Ragtime, 2-Cafè Concerto, 3-Ragtime Boogie, 4- Ballade, 5-J.S.Bach Joke, 6-Jazz Viola Prelude)
 Jerusalem Fantasy for unaccompanied viola (homage to A.Vinitsky)
 Samba for unaccompanied viola (homage to A.Vinitsky)
 Star Wars Suite for unaccompanied viola (homage to John Williams)
 Jazz Caprices for unaccompanied viola
 3 Pieces, Homage to Charlie Byrd for unaccompanied viola (1-Swing'59, 2-Blues for Felix, 3-Spanish Viola Blues)
 Fantasia on the Irish folk song "The last rose of summer" : for violin and piano / Romolo Pio Misciagna ; (revision and violin cadence by Marco Misciagna)
Arrangements:

 Isaac Albéniz (1860–1909): Rumores de la caleta (from: Recuerdos de viaje, for piano, op. 71) / Asturias (from: Suite española No. 1, for piano, op. 47)
 Francisco Tárrega (1852–1909): Tango for guitar Fernando Sor (1778–1839): Andante (from: 24 leçons progressives, for guitar, op. 31)
 Manuel De Falla: Danza del molinero aus El sombrero de tres picos
 Julio Salvador Sagreras- El colibrí - Imitación al vuelo del picaflor
 Jacques Bittner: Suite for Viola
 Carl Philipp Emmanuel Bach: Pedal Excercition, for Viola
 Carl Philipp Emmanuel Bach: Sonata in a minor, for Viola

Awards 

His awards include:

 2017 - Award “Arte, Sport e territorio” – Excellence from Puglia.
 2019 - International Award "Fountains of Rome" (37th edition), for the prestigious international artistic-musical career, worthy of the famous and historic Italian tradition;
 2019 - Elmo Prize "Stories of Ordinary Culture" for the recognized merits and the prestigious career of the Maestro (Rizziconi, RC);
 2019 - International Prize GOLD MEDAL "Maison des Artistes" (“La Sapienza” Rome University);
 2019 - Constantinus Magnus International Award (Constantinian Nemagnic Order of St.Stephen);
 2019 - “Vigna d’Argento” Award (Palazzo Montecitorio, Chamber of Deputies, Rome);
 2019 - International Award "Duchess Lucrezia Borgia"
 2019 - “Città di Napoli” International Award for Art, Culture and Fashion, 9th Edition Academy Oscar.
 2019 - “Cicero Award” (Fondazione “Marco Tullio Cicerone”)
 2019 - Vincenzo Crocitti Award(“VINCE International”, Rome)
 2020 - The "Silver Chimera" 2020 award
 2021 - National Award "Silver Eagle"

Honors 

 Honorary Citizenship of the City of Ayvalık – Turkey (February 2018)
 Medal for Cooperation in Ukraine. No. 988 - 2 November 2020
 Medal of the Order of St. George Ukraine. No.1725 – 2 November 2020

References

External links 

 Site is undergoing maintenance
 MAURICE VIEUX
 Campagnoli: 41 Caprices for Viola Op.22, arranged for Viola & Piano by Carl Albert Tottmann - Brilliant Classics
 Marco Misciagna
 Марко Мишанья
 Alion Baltic Music Festival | Marco Misciagna
 Marco Misciagna & Marco Ciannella
 Pantonale Musikveranstaltungen des Pantonale e.V. Berlin - PHILHARMONIKA 2016
 IL CONSOLE ONORARIO MARCO GINESI PRESENZIA ALLA VIII EDIZIONE DEL “CONSTATINUS MAGNUS”.
 Fahri Ayvalıklı Misciagna’dan çılgın İspanyol dansları

1984 births
Living people
Italian classical violists
Italian classical violinists
Violists
21st-century Italian male musicians
People from Bari